is a railway station on the Kyūdai Main Line in Kokonoe, Ōita Prefecture, Japan.

Lines

Layout 
The station consists of two side platforms serving two tracks at grade. The station building, rebuilt in 2010, is a traditional Japanese design with a thatched roof. It houses a waiting area as well as the premises and information centre of the Kokonoe Town Tourism Association. The association also acts as a kan'i itaku agent and manages the ticket window which is equipped with a POS machine but does not have a Midori no Madoguchi facility. Access to the opposite side platform is by means of a footbridge.

Adjacent stations

History
The Daito Railway was nationalized on 1 December 1922, after which Japanese Government Railways (JGR) undertook phased westward expansion of the track which, at the time, it had designated as the Daito Line. By 1926, the track had reached . Subsequently, the track was extended further west and Bungo-Nakamura was opened as the new western terminus on 28 October 1928. On 15 November 1934, when the Daito Line had linked up with the Kyudai Main Line further west, JGR designated the station as part of the Kyudai Main Line. With the privatization of Japanese National Railways (JNR), the successor of JGR, on 1 April 1987, the station came under the control of JR Kyushu.

The original station building was a Japanese style timber building with a tiled roof. This was rebuilt in 2010 by Kokonoe Town authorities. The new building was still in traditional Japanese style with white plaster walls and a thatched roof. In April 2011, local residents opened a cafeteria in the station building which served meals made from local ingredients but this closed in March 2013. Subsequently, the Kokonoe Town Tourism Association moved its offices to the station building and set up an information centre there in October 2013.

Passenger statistics
In fiscal 2015, there were a total of 28,340 boarding passengers, giving a daily average of 78 passengers.

See also
 List of railway stations in Japan

References

External links
Bungo-Nakamura (JR Kyushu)

Railway stations in Ōita Prefecture
Railway stations in Japan opened in 1928